Dunsmuir may refer to:
 Dunsmuir, California, a city in the northern part of the state
 Dunsmuir station, an Amtrak station in Dunsmuir, California
 Dunsmuir station (British Columbia), a Via Rail station
 Dola Dunsmuir, Canadian socialite
 James Dunsmuir, Canadian industrialist and former premier of British Columbia
 Robert Dunsmuir, Canadian industrialist

See also 
 Dunsmuir v New Brunswick, a leading Supreme Court of Canada case on judicial review
 Dunsmuir House, an Oakland mansion built by a son of Robert Dunsmuir
 Dunsmuir Botanical Gardens, a park in Dunsmuir, California
 Dunsmuir Tunnel, a subway tunnel under its namesake Vancouver street
 Dunsmuir Municipal-Mott Airport, an airport near Dunsmuir, California
 Dunsmuir Viaduct, a viaduct in downtown Vancouver